Nevada Township is located in Livingston County, Illinois. At the 2010 census, its population was 1,335 and it contained 101 housing units.

The Illinois Department of Corrections Dwight Correctional Center is within the township. Dwight Correctional Center houses the State of Illinois female death row.

Geography

Demographics

Notable people
Eddie Higgins (baseball), MLB pitcher for the St. Louis Cardinals

References

External links

US Census
City-data.com
Illinois State Archives

Townships in Livingston County, Illinois
Populated places established in 1857
Townships in Illinois
1857 establishments in Illinois